Ginebis argenteonitens is a species of deep-water sea snail, a marine gastropod mollusk in the family Eucyclidae.

Description
The size of the shell varies between 37 mm and 60 mm. The thin, imperforate, yellowish shell has a conoidal shape. Its apex is acute. It is beautifully iridescent, the underlying nacre shining through. The eight whorls are a little convex. They are obsoletely sculptured with incremental striae. The suture has a series of fine short folds on each side. Three last whorls are covered with a median series of tubercles. The aperture covers almost half the entire altitude. The body whorl is encircled by an acute compressed carina at the base. The base of the shell is very convex, with 8 narrow crenulated spiral lirae, the first 3 separated, the rest closer. The aperture is rounded-subquadrate. The columella is sinuous, and brilliantly pearly.

Distribution
This marine species occurs off Japan, in the East China Sea, off Taiwan and off the Philippines

References

 Poppe G.T., Tagaro S.P. & Dekker H. (2006) The Seguenziidae, Chilodontidae, Trochidae, Calliostomatidae and Solariellidae of the Philippine Islands. Visaya Supplement 2: 1–228, page(s): 56
 Hasegawa K. (2009) Upper bathyal gastropods of the Pacific coast of northern Honshu, Japan, chiefly collected by R/V Wakataka-maru. In: T. Fujita (ed.), Deep-sea fauna and pollutants off Pacific coast of northern Japan. National Museum of Nature and Science Monographs 39: 225-383

External links
 

argenteonitens
Gastropods described in 1872